Hypsopygia olapalis is a species of snout moth in the genus Hypsopygia. It was described by Viette in 1978, and is known from Madagascar.

References

Moths described in 1978
Pyralini